No 'Count is an album by saxophonist Frank Foster recorded in 1956 and released on the Savoy label.

Reception

Allmusic reviewer by Jim Todd stating, "the four horns carved out from the Count Basie band for this Frank Foster-led date get along just fine with drummer Kenny Clarke, bassist Eddie Jones, and guitarist Kenny Burrell. The set is a companion to Frank Wess' North, South, East....Wess, recorded by the same players at the same sessions. No Count, however, stays closer to Kansas City swing than the Wess release ... Foster's charts provide for lots of interplay and counterpoint between the two trombones and two tenors".

Track listing 
All compositions by Frank Foster except where noted
 "Stop Gap" – 6:01
 "Excursion" – 5:13
 "Casa de Marcel" – 6:31
 "Apron Strings" – 3:35
 "Alternative" – 8:56
 "Serenata" (Leroy Anderson) – 4:52
Recorded at Van Gelder Studio, Hackensack, NJ on March 5, 1956 (tracks 1, 5 & 6) and March 7, 1956 (tracks 2-4)

Personnel 
Frank Foster – tenor saxophone
Henry Coker, Benny Powell – trombone
Frank Wess – tenor saxophone, flute
Kenny Burrell – guitar
Eddie Jones - bass
Kenny Clarke - drums

References 

Frank Foster (musician) albums
1956 albums
Savoy Records albums
Albums produced by Ozzie Cadena
Albums recorded at Van Gelder Studio